Fordham is an unincorporated community in Jefferson County, in the U.S. state of Pennsylvania.

History
A post office was established at Fordham in 1893, and closed the next year in 1894.

Notable person
Steve Harrick, head football coach at West Virginia Tech from 1935 to 1946, was born in Fordham in 1897.

References

Unincorporated communities in Jefferson County, Pennsylvania
Unincorporated communities in Pennsylvania